The following is a timeline of the history of the city of Conakry, Guinea.

Prior to 20th century
 1885 – French in power on Tombo Island.
 1891 – Conakry becomes capital of French colonial Riviéres du Sud.
 1893 – Conakry becomes part of colonial French Guinea.

20th century

 1904 – Conakry municipality established.
 1914 – Kankan-Conakry railway begins operating.
 1928 – Cathedrale Sainte-Marie construction begins.
 1937 – La Douce Parisette (musical group) active.
 1943 – Population: 21,217 city; 5,586 suburbs.
 1947 – Franco-Guinean Union (political party) headquartered in city.
 1948 – Population: 30,000 city.
 1951 – Hafia Football Club formed.
 1954 – Hotel de France in business.
 1955 – Catholic Metropolitan Archdiocese of Conakry established.
 1956 – Ahmed Sékou Touré elected mayor.
 1958
 City becomes part of independent Guinea.
 Population: 78,388 city.
 Area of city: 2,000 hectares.
 1959 – Donka Hospital built.
 1960
 Camp Boiro concentration camp begins operating.
 Sandervalia National Museum established.
 1960s – Bembeya Jazz band active.
 1961 – Horoya newspaper begins publication.
 1962
 Polytechnical Institute of Conakry established.
 Stade du 28 Septembre opens.
 1964
 Quinzaines Artistiques cultural festival begins.
 Hotel Palm Camayenne in business.
 Population: 175,000 urban agglomeration (including city).
 1966 – Palais du Peuple built.
 1967 – Population: 197,267 urban agglomeration (estimate).
 1970 – 22 November: Portuguese invasion of Guinea-Conakry.
 1971
 January: Hanging of government officials on 8 November Bridge.
 Monument du 22 Novembre 1970 erected.
 1973 – 20 January: Assassination of Bissau-Guinean revolutionary Amílcar Cabral.
 1975 – Horoya Athlétique Club formed.
 1982 – Conakry Grand Mosque opens.
 1983
 Population: 100,000 city.
 Area of city: 6,900 hectares.
 1984 – March: Funeral of Ahmed Sékou Touré.
 1985 – Conakry International Airport terminal built.
 1991 – City administration sectioned into 5 communes: Dixinn, Kaloum, Matam, Matoto, Ratoma.
 1992 – Le Lynx satirical newspaper begins publication.
 1998 – Presidential Palace rebuilt.
 1999 – Hotel Mariador Palace in business.

21st century

 2004 – Maison du Livre (bookshop) in business.
 2007 – January–February: 2007 Guinean general strike.
 2008
 26 September: Funeral of Lansana Conté.
 23 December: 2008 Guinean coup d'état.
 2009 – 28 September: 2009 Guinea protest and crackdown.
 2010 – September: Pre-election unrest.
 2011
 Nongo Stadium built.
 Population: 1,786,000 (urban agglomeration).
 2014
 March: Conakry regional governor Sékou Resco Camara leaves office.
 Population: 1,659,785.
 2017 – City named World Book Capital by UNESCO.

See also
 List of Conakry mayors and other local officials (in French)
 History of Guinea
 Politics of Guinea

References

This article incorporates information from the French Wikipedia and German Wikipedia.

Bibliography

in English
 
 
 
 
 
 
 

in French
  (+ table of contents)

External links

  (Bibliography of open access  articles)
  (Images, etc.)
  (Images, etc.)
  (Bibliography)
  (Bibliography)
  (Bibliography)
  (Bibliography)
 

Conakry
Conakry
Conakry
Conakry
Conakry